This is a list of earthquakes in 1928. Only magnitude 6.0 or greater earthquakes appear on the list. Lower magnitude events are included if they have caused death, injury or damage. Events which occurred in remote areas will be excluded from the list as they wouldn't have generated significant media interest. All dates are listed according to UTC time. It was an active year with several events leading to deaths. Worst affected were Chile, Turkey, Bulgaria and the Philippines. Oaxaca, Mexico and Puno Region, Peru sustained several large earthquakes with the former seeing four reaching above magnitude 7.0. In spite of a series of earthquakes, only four deaths were caused in Mexico during the year.

Overall

By death toll 

 Note: At least 10 casualties

By magnitude 

 Note: At least 7.0 magnitude

Notable events

January

February

March

April

May

June

July

August

September

October

November

December

References 

1928
 
1928